A lifejacket is a marine safety flotation device.

Lifejacket may also refer to:
Lifejacket (album) by Ian Shaw
Lifejackets (album) by Danish-based indie rock band Mimas.